Mileto railway station is a railway station of the Italian city of Mileto, Calabria, part of the Battipaglia–Reggio di Calabria railway. Is located in the frazione of Paravati.

History 
The station was built during the late 1960s as part of the variant direttissima between Rosarno railway station and Lamezia Terme Centrale railway station. It was opened in 1972.

Layout 
The station has four tracks, two side platforms and one island platform, which are connected each other with an underpass. The station building has no service due to lack of passengers.

Services 
The station is served only by regional trains operated by Trenitalia.

References 

Railway stations in Calabria
Railway stations opened in 1972
1972 establishments in Italy
Mileto
Railway stations in Italy opened in the 20th century